Paired box gene 9, also known as PAX9, is a protein which in humans is encoded by the PAX9  gene. It is also found in other mammals.

Expression and function 

This gene is a member of the paired box (PAX) family of transcription factors.  During mouse embryogenesis Pax9 expression starts from embryonic day 8.5 and becomes more evident by E9.5; at this stage its expression is restricted to the pharyngeal endoderm. Later on, Pax9 is also expressed in the axial skeleton. Pax9 is required for craniofacial, tooth and limb development, and may more generally involve development of stratified squamous epithelia as well as various organs and skeletal elements.  PAX9 plays a role in the absence of wisdom teeth in some human populations (possibly along with the less well studied AXIN2 and MSX1).

Clinical significance 

This gene was found amplified in lung cancer.  The amplification covers three tissue developmental genes - TTF1, NKX2-8, and PAX9. It appears that certain lung cancer cells select for DNA copy number amplification and increased RNA/protein expression of these three coamplified genes for functional advantages.

Oligodontia 
Oligodontia is a genetic disorder caused by the mutation of the PAX9 gene. This disorder results in the congenital absence of 6 or more permanent teeth, with the exception of the third molar. Also known as selective tooth agenesis (STHAG), it is the most common disorder in regard to human dentition, affecting a little less than one fourth of the population. The gene PAX9 which can be found on chromosome 14 encodes a group of transcription factors that play an important role in early tooth development. In humans, a frameshift mutation in the paired domain of PAX9 was discovered in those affected with oligodontia. Multiple mechanisms are possible by which the mutation may arise. Recently, a study involving the missense mutation of a PAX9 gene suggests that the loss of function due to the absence DNA binding domain is a mechanism that causes oligodontia. Those who express the PAX9 mutation and develop the disorder continue to have a normal life expectancy. Along with the mutation of the PAX9 gene, MSX1 gene mutations have also shown to affect dental development in fetuses.

Interactions 

PAX9 has been shown to interact with JARID1B.

References

Further reading

External links 
 

Transcription factors